Myles Bryant (born January 2, 1998) is an American football cornerback for the New England Patriots of the National Football League (NFL). He played college football at Washington.

College career 
Bryant played college football at Washington, where he was a three-time All-Pac 12 selection—twice on the second-team, and once as an honorable mention. He appeared in a total of 39 games, recording 177 tackles, 4 interceptions, 3 forced fumbles, and 3.5 sacks.

Professional career 

Bryant went undrafted in the 2020 NFL Draft, and signed with the New England Patriots on May 5, 2020. He was waived during final roster cuts on September 5, 2020, and re-signed to the team's practice squad the next day. He was promoted to the active roster on September 16, made his NFL debut in Week 8 against the Buffalo Bills,  recorded his first tackle two weeks later in a win against the Ravens, and recorded his first interception in week 14 against the Rams.

On August 31, 2021, Bryant was waived by the Patriots and re-signed to the practice squad. He was promoted to the active roster on October 19, 2021. In the Patriots' 54–13 rout of the New York Jets, Bryant recorded his first sack and first forced fumble.

NFL career statistics

Regular season

Postseason

References 

Living people
1998 births
American football cornerbacks
New England Patriots players
Players of American football from Pasadena, California
Washington Huskies football players